Sekhemre Sementawy Djehuti (also Djehuty and other variants) was possibly the second king of the Theban 16th Dynasty reigning over parts of Upper Egypt during the Second Intermediate Period. Alternatively, he may be a king of the late 13th Dynasty or the fourth king of the 17th Dynasty. Djehuty is credited with a reign of 3 years in the first entry of the 11th column of the Turin canon. According to Egyptologists Kim Ryholt and Darrell Baker, he was succeeded by Sobekhotep VIII.


Chronological position
Djehuti's dynasty remains debated. Indeed, on this point, the Turin Canon is open to interpretations. There are several kings recorded with the name "Sekhemre[...]" and the damage to the original document does not preserve the complete name. As a result, Djehuti, named Sekhemre Sementawy, may in principle correspond to any "Sekhemre[...]" preserved on the king list, i.e. may be a ruler of the 13th, 16th and even 17th Dynasty.

The Egyptologists Darrell Baker and Kim Ryholt believe that he was part of the 16th Dynasty, which controlled the Theban region after 1650 BC.
Alternatively, two studies by Claude Vandersleyen and Christina Geisen date Djehuti's reign to the very end of the Memphite 13th Dynasty. Geisen's datation relies on stylistic considerations of his queen's coffin, which however, Stephen Quirke argues, uses unproven assumptions. An older theory of Jürgen von Beckerath, whose conclusions are shared by Hans Stock, contends that Djehuti was a ruler of the early 17th Dynasty, which arose in Upper Egypt after the collapse of 16th Dynasty following the short-lived Hyksos conquest of Thebes. This theory is supported by the discovery of the tomb of Djehuti's queen, Mentuhotep, which is located in Dra' Abu el-Naga', a necropolis usually associated with the 17th Dynasty. Scholars such as Chris Bennett however, point out that this does not necessarily mean that Djehuti was buried in Dra' Abu el-Naga' as well.

Some Egyptologists proposed that Djehuti was married to a granddaughter of the vizier Ibiaw who served under the 13th Dynasty king Wahibre Ibiau c. 1712–1701 BC, and was thus most likely two generations removed from this king. In more recent times, however, it was pointed out that the link between Ibiaw and Djehuti's consort Mentuhotep is still unproven and that the proposed temporal correlation between Wahibre Ibiau and Djehuti remains conjectural.

Attestations

Djehuti is attested on the Turin Royal Canon and the Karnak king list. This roughly corresponds to the territory in the sphere of influence of the rulers of the 16th dynasty. Djehuti's nomen and prenomen are known from a single block discovered by Flinders Petrie in Deir el-Ballas. A painted block bearing Djehuti's cartouche and showing him wearing the red crown of Lower Egypt – far beyond his sphere of influence – was uncovered in Edfu and otherwise, Djehuti is only attested by objects from his wife's burial. Queen Mentuhotep's tomb was found intact in 1822 and her (now lost) coffin was inscribed with one of the earliest cases of the texts from the Book of the Dead. Mentuhotep's cosmetic box bears Djehuti's nomen, prenomen and cartouche together with funerary formulae and an inscription revealing that the box was a gift from the king.

It has been suggested that the unattributed Southern South Saqqara pyramid may have been built for Djehuti. This hypothesis is based on a fragmentary inscription found within the pyramid and reading "Weserkha...", a possible reference to Weserkhau i.e. Djehuti's Golden Horus name.

References

17th-century BC Pharaohs
Pharaohs of the Sixteenth Dynasty of Egypt